Rebel Meets Rebel is a country metal album by David Allan Coe and Pantera members Dimebag Darrell, Rex Brown, and Vinnie Paul. The music was written and recorded by the band when the musicians had time aside from their other projects, including Pantera's world tour supporting Reinventing the Steel.

The album was released on May 2, 2006, under Vinnie Paul's own label Big Vin Records, posthumously after Darrell's murder in December 2004.

Background
At the close of the decade, Coe met Pantera guitarist Dimebag Darrell in Fort Worth, Texas. The two musicians, struck by the similarity of the approaches between country and heavy metal, agreed to work together. Darrell was the son of Jerry Abbott, a country songwriter and producer. Together with Darrell's brother Vinnie Paul and bassist Rex Brown, they began production of the album which was recorded sporadically between 1999 and 2003. It was released in 2006, two years after Darrell's murder.

Originally, the song "Rebel Meets Rebel" was supposed to be released as a duet with Coe and Pantera's vocalist Phil Anselmo.

Music and lyrics
The album's lyrical content ranges from boisterous songs regarding drinking and getting stoned to more serious subject matter, such as the song "Cherokee Cry", which criticizes the United States government's treatment of Native Americans.

Rebel Meets Rebel features what has been described as a "groundbreaking" mix of country music and heavy metal. AllMusic writer Megan Frye wrote, "On first listen, ["Nothin' to Lose"] sounds awkward—as if someone had spliced a Pantera song together with a David Allan Coe one on their home computer. It doesn't mesh well, and the bass seems too sharp and tinny. But after listening to the album a few times, it starts to make more sense." Dimebag Darrell was praised for his guitar playing, which incorporated elements from thrash metal, as well as dark melodic playing. "Rebel Meets Rebel" features fiddle playing by Joey Floyd.

Track listing

Personnel
 David Allan Coe – lead vocals, rhythm guitar
 Dimebag Darrell – lead guitar, backing vocals
 Rex Brown – bass guitar
 Vinnie Paul – drums
 Joey Floyd – fiddle on "Rebel Meets Rebel"
 Hank Williams III – vocals on "Get Outta My Life"
 Rex Mauney – keyboards

Chart positions
Album

References

External links
 Official website (archived)

2006 albums
Country metal albums
David Allan Coe albums
Albums published posthumously